FX Palo Alto Laboratory, Inc. (FXPAL) was a research center for Fuji Xerox Co., Ltd.  FXPAL employed roughly 25 Ph.D. scientists conducting research in a variety of fields spanning information retrieval, multimedia computing, HCI, and smart environments.

FXPAL's mission was to provide Fuji Xerox a digital information technology base for the 21st century. This goal is accomplished through: 
 Research and invention of new information technologies 
 Cooperation with Fuji Xerox business units to develop and transition information technologies
 Interaction with the US software industry to discover and tailor new products for the Fuji Xerox market

FXPAL was shut down in 2020.

See also 
 Fuji Xerox

References

External links 
 Fuji Xerox Co., Ltd.

Fuji Xerox
Research organizations in the United States
Technology transfer
Companies based in Palo Alto, California
Science and technology in the San Francisco Bay Area
Research and development in the United States
1995 establishments in California